Jahači magle (trans. Fog Riders) is the third studio album from Serbian and former Yugoslav rock band Bajaga i Instruktori, released in 1986.

The album, produced by Saša Habić, featured numerous guests: Josipa Lisac on backing vocals, Jane Parđovski (of Jakarta), Vlada Negovanović, Duda Bezuha, and Rajko Kojić (Momčilo Bajagić's former bandmate from Riblja Čorba) on guitar, Đorđe Petrović on keyboards, and others. It was also the last Bajaga i Instruktori album recorded with vocalist Dejan Cukić, who left the band after the tour which followed the album release to pursue a solo career.

The song "Samo nam je ljubav potrebna" features a quotation from the Beatles song "All You Need Is Love".

The album was polled in 1998 as the 58th on the list of 100 greatest Yugoslav rock and pop albums in the book YU 100: najbolji albumi jugoslovenske rok i pop muzike (YU 100: The Best albums of Yugoslav pop and rock music).

Track listing
All songs written by Momčilo Bajagić, except where noted.
"Ja mislim 300 na sat" – 4:41
"Kao ne zna da je gotivim" – 3:48
"Gde stiže moje sećanje" – 4:26
"Red i mir" – 2:57
"Rimljani" - 4:18
"Samo nam je ljubav potrebna" (Ž. Milenković, M. Bajagić, Lennon-McCartney) – 3:54
"Strah od vozova" – 5:34
"Bam, bam, bam" – 5:10
"442 do Beograda" – 4:42

Personnel
Momčilo Bajagić - guitar, vocals, arranged by
Dejan Cukić - vocals
Žika Milenković - guitar, vocals
Miroslav Cvetković - bass guitar, backing vocals
Nenad Stamatović - guitar
Saša Lokner - keyboards
Vladimir Golubović - drums, percussion, arranged by

Additional personnel
Jane Parđovski - guitar (on track 2)
Vlada Negovanović - guitar (on tracks: 3, 8)
Rajko Kojić - guitar (on track 7)
Duda Bezuha - guitar (solo on track 7)
Nenad Stefanović - bass guitar (on track 2)
Slobodan Božanić - fretless bass
Nenad Nesa Petrović - saxophone
Goran Grbić - trumpet
Đorđe Petrović, keyboards (on track 5), backing vocals (on track 5)
Josipa Lisac - backing vocals (on track 1)
Nera - backing vocals (on tracks: 2, 4)
Saša Habić - producer, handclaps (on track 9)
Kornelije Kovač - arranged by (track 5)

Reception and legacy
The album's biggest hits were "Ja mislim 300 na sat", "Rimljani", "Samo nam je ljubav potrebna", "Bam, bam, bam", and "442 do Beograda".

The album was polled in 1998 as the 58th on the list of 100 greatest Yugoslav rock and pop albums in the book YU 100: najbolji albumi jugoslovenske rok i pop muzike (YU 100: The Best albums of Yugoslav pop and rock music).

Due to the positive reaction by the audience and Bajaga i Instruktori themselves, Amajlija also performed on the Jahači magle tour, during which, due to a quarrel, the band disbanded.

Covers
 Serbian pop duo Next of Kin covered the song "Strah od vozova" on their 1990 album Way to the Top.

References 

Jahači magle at Discogs
 EX YU ROCK enciklopedija 1960-2006,  Janjatović Petar;

External links 
Jahači magle at Discogs

Bajaga i Instruktori albums
1986 albums
PGP-RTB albums